Stephen Grehan (born 30 December 1971) is an Irish retired hurler who played as a left corner-forward for the Kilkenny senior team.

Grehan joined the team during the 1999 championship and was a regular member of the team until his retirement from inter-county hurling after four seasons. During that time he won three Leinster winners' medals and one National Hurling League winners' medal.

At club level Grehan played with the Fenians club.

References

1971 births
Living people
Fenians hurlers
Kilkenny inter-county hurlers
Leinster inter-provincial hurlers